Rich Creek may refer to:

Rich Creek, Tennessee, an unincorporated community
Rich Creek, Virginia, a town in Virginia
Rich Creek (Bluestone River), a stream in West Virginia
Rich Creek (Read Creek), a creek in New York